La Rioja Province may refer to:
 La Rioja Province, Argentina
 La Rioja Province, Spain

Province name disambiguation pages